Sí, soy llanero is the first studio album by Colombian band Cimarron.

This 2004 record production earned a Grammy nominee for Best Traditional World Music Album.

Recording 
The album was produced by Carlos "Cuco" Rojas, harpist and founder of Cimarron, and Daniel Sheeny, director of the non-profit record label Smithsonian Folkways Recordings.

It was recorded by Pete Reinger at Audio Productions Patrick Mildenberg, in Bogotá (Colombia). Reinger also mixed the album in Smithsonian Folkways. The mastering was done by Charlie Pilzer, at Airshow Mastering, in Springfield (Virginia).

Tour 
The songs on this album were performed live by Cimarron on stages such as the Smithsonian Folklife Festival (Washington), the National Cowboy Poetry Gathering (Elko, Nevada) and the International Book Fair of Panama.

Grammy nomination 
Sí, soy llanero was nominated for Best Traditional World Music Album in the 47th Annual Grammy Awards.

Track listing 

 Llanero sí soy llanero
 Los diamantes
 Pajarillo
 Un llanero de verdad
 Los Merecures
 Y soy llanero
 Seis por derecho
 El gaván restiao
 Quitapesares
 Atardecer en Arauca
 Zumbaquezumba
 María Laya
 Puerto Carreño
 Se me murió mi caballo
 Las tres damas
 Soy llanero pelo-piso
 Pajarillo

Musicians 

 Ana Veydó (lead vocals)
 Carlos "Cuco" Rojas (harpist and composer)
 Luis Eduardo Moreno "El Gallito Lagunero" (vocals)
 Yesid Benites Sarmiento (Bandola)
 Omar Edgar Fandiño Ramírez (Maracas)
 Wilton Ernesto Games Balcárcel (Coplero)
 Hugo Antonio Molina Martínez (Bandola)
 Pedro Libardo Rey Rojas (Cuatro)
 Ricardo Zapata Barrios (Bass)

References 

2004 debut albums
Cimarrón (band) albums